Pierre Jarret de Verchères ( –  1708) was a French-Canadian military officer. His father, François, was the founder of Verchères, now a suburb of Montreal, Quebec. In 1691, as a teenager, along with his older sister Madeleine and his younger brother Alexandre, he helped defend his father's fort for a week. Jarret de Verchères was killed in 1708 after his raiding party was ambushed following an attack on Haverhill, Massachusetts.

References

1670s births
1708 deaths
People of New France